is a former Japanese football player.

Club career
Sukigara was born in Tokyo on April 2, 1966. After graduating from University of Tsukuba, he joined Yomiuri (later Verdy Kawasaki) in 1989. However he could hardly play in the match at the club which had many Japan national team players. In March 1994, he moved to Urawa Reds. At Reds, the only match he played was against his old club Verdy. In 1995, he moved to Japan Football League club Fukushima FC. Although he played many matches, the club was disbanded in 1997.

National team career
In 1988, when Sukigara was a University of Tsukuba student, he was selected Japan national "B team" for 1988 Asian Cup. But he did not play in the match.

Club statistics

References

External links

ocn.ne.jp

1966 births
Living people
University of Tsukuba alumni
Association football people from Tokyo
Japanese footballers
Japan Soccer League players
J1 League players
Japan Football League (1992–1998) players
Tokyo Verdy players
Urawa Red Diamonds players
Fukushima FC players
Association football forwards